2013 census may refer to:

Alberta municipal censuses, 2013
2013 population census in Bosnia and Herzegovina
2013 New Zealand census